Abarema abbottii, the Abbott abarema, is a species of plant in the family Fabaceae. It is found only in the Dominican Republic, and is confined to broad-leaved woodlands on limestone soils.

Morphology
The tree is a perennial plant. It is 4 to 12 metres tall, with rough grey bark.

Distribution and habitat
Distribution: Restricted to north-east Dominican Republic, on the southern shore of Samana Bay and west towards Sa Quita-espuela.

Habitat: A tree confined to broad-leaved woodland on limestone soils up to 800 metres.

References

abbottii
Endemic flora of the Dominican Republic
Vulnerable plants
Taxonomy articles created by Polbot
Taxa named by James Walter Grimes
Taxa named by Rupert Charles Barneby